Tomer Zimmerman (born 27 December 1966) is an Israeli former professional tennis player.

A native of Tel Aviv, Zimmerman had a best world ranking of 384 and was runner-up at the 1987 Durban Challenger. He also featured in the qualifying draw at Wimbledon in 1988 and had multiple appearances at the Tel Aviv Open.

Zimmerman played collegiate tennis in the United States for Pepperdine University.

ATP Challenger finals

Singles: 1 (0–1)

References

External links
 
 

1966 births
Living people
Israeli male tennis players
Pepperdine Waves men's tennis players
Sportspeople from Tel Aviv